Hugo Liisberg (23 July 1896 – 12 April 1958) was a Danish sculptor. His work was part of the sculpture event in the art competition at the 1932 Summer Olympics.

References

1896 births
1958 deaths
20th-century Danish sculptors
Male sculptors
Olympic competitors in art competitions
People from Copenhagen
Danish male artists
20th-century Danish male artists